Pei is an East Asian surname originating in north China. In 2008, it was the 156th most common surname in mainland China, with at least 830,000 Chinese sharing this name.

There are also people with this surname  based on the same Chinese letter in Vietnam (as Bùi), where it is in relative terms much more common (the 9th most common surname), and Korea (as Bae; 배).

The surname Lei was accidentally created from Pei as a result of a transcription error.

By coincidence, "Pei" is also an Italian surname (of two syllables), whose meaning may derive from the pear or pear tree, or alternatively, represent an abbreviation of "Pietro" or "Pompeo."

Notable people

Historical Figures
Pei clan of Hedong
Pei Xiu (224–271), minister, geographer, and cartographer during the Three Kingdoms and Jin Dynasty
Pei Songzhi (372–451), Liu Song dynasty historian
Pei Ji (Sui and Tang) Official and Chancellor of the Tang Dynasty
Pei Ju Official of the Sui Dynasty and Chancellor of the Tang Dynasty
Pei Yan (died 684), Tang dynasty official

Modern Figures
Carl Pei (born Péi Yǔ; 1989–), Chinese-born Swedish entrepreneur
Pei Wenzhong (1904–1982), anthropologist

Italians
Mario Pei (1901-1978), linguist

References

Chinese-language surnames

Individual Chinese surnames

ko:배 (성씨)